Shiman-e Zir Ab (also Romanized as Shīman-e Zīr Āb; also known as Zīr Āb) is a village in Susan-e Gharbi Rural District, Susan District, Izeh County, Khuzestan Province, Iran. At the 2006 census, its population was 98, in 16 families.

References 

Populated places in Izeh County